The Independence Flagpole or the Philippine National Flagpole is a  flagpole located near the Rizal Monument in Rizal Park in Manila, Philippines. It is the highest flagpole in the country.

History

The Independence Flagpole was the location where the Philippine flag was hoisted on July 4, 1946, when full independence was achieved from the United States.

Restoration
Plans to restore the flagpole's original height was proposed in 2011 by the National Parks Development Committee (NPDC) of the Department of Tourism. The renovation project is one of the government body's commemorative projects for the 150th anniversary of Jose Rizal's birth.

The flagpole's structural integrity was reinforced and a mechanized pulley in lieu of the manual pulley was installed along with a marble base. The renovation project was implemented by the DPWH's Manila South Engineering District while the project contractor was AKH Construction. The material used for the new flagpole is Q345 steel. The steel and two cranes of the flag pole were both imported from Hong Kong. The flagpole's construction took less than a month and was finished in September 2013. The newer flagpole was divided into three segments. The old flagpole was moved to the Aguinaldo Shrine in Kawit, Cavite.

The project details of the flagpole restoration went viral and was a subject of controversy due to its price which critics found overpriced. There were also concerns regarding the structural integrity of the newer flagpole. The DPWH defended the project emphasizing the flag's historical value and assured the public that a structural analysis has been conducted. They also emphasized that the renovation project planned as early as since 2011 went through a bidding process and justified the cost citing the improvements then to be made for the flagpole.

In February 2016, another renovation work was commenced. The marble based was demolished and new lighting were installed at the flagpole's base.

Markers
The base of the Independence Flagpole contains the following markers:

References

Buildings and structures in Ermita
Flagpoles